George Corbin Washington (August 20, 1789 – July 17, 1854) was a United States Congressman from the third and fifth districts of Maryland, serving four terms from 1827 to 1833, and 1835 to 1837.

Early life and education
Washington was born at Haywood Farms near Oak Grove in Westmoreland County, Virginia, the son of William Augustine Washington and his first wife Jane Washington. He attended Phillips Academy and Harvard University, studied law, but devoted himself to agricultural pursuits on his plantation in Maryland. 

He was a grandnephew of U.S. President George Washington, as the grandson of George's half-brother Augustine Jr. (on his father’s side) and of George’s brother John (on his mother’s side).

Career
He resided for the most part at Dumbarton Heights in the Georgetown neighborhood in Washington, D.C., and served in the Maryland House of Delegates 1816-1819. Washington was elected to the Twentieth, Twenty-first, and Twenty-second Congresses, serving three terms from March 4, 1827, until March 3, 1833. In Congress, he served as chairman of the Committee on District of Columbia during the Twenty-second Congress. He was not a candidate for renomination in 1832, but was elected two years later as an Anti-Jacksonian to the Twenty-fourth Congress, serving one term from March 4, 1835, to March 3, 1837, and following that he was not a candidate for renomination.

After his service in Congress, Washington became president of the Chesapeake and Ohio Canal Company. He was also appointed by President John Tyler in 1844 as a commissioner to adjust and settle the claims arising under the treaty of 1835 with the Treaty faction of the Cherokee Nation.

In 1852, he was nominated by the Know Nothings as a candidate for vice president on a ticket with Daniel Webster. Upon Webster's death nine days before the election, the ticket was replaced by Jacob Broom and Reynell Coates.

Death
He died on July 17, 1854, in the Georgetown neighborhood of Washington, D.C., and is interred in Oak Hill Cemetery.

References

External links
 
 

1789 births
1854 deaths
American people of English descent
Burials at Oak Hill Cemetery (Washington, D.C.)
Harvard University alumni
Maryland Know Nothings
Members of the Maryland House of Delegates
People from Georgetown (Washington, D.C.)
People from Westmoreland County, Virginia
Phillips Academy alumni
George Corbin
National Republican Party members of the United States House of Representatives from Maryland
19th-century American politicians